Seroczyn may refer to the following places:
Seroczyn, Ostrołęka County in Masovian Voivodeship (east-central Poland)
Seroczyn, Siedlce County in Masovian Voivodeship (east-central Poland)
Seroczyn, Sokołów County in Masovian Voivodeship (east-central Poland)